Yves Hadley Desmarets (born 19 July 1979) is a Haitian former professional footballer who played as a left midfielder.

He spent the vast majority of his professional career, which started at the age of 27, in Portugal, representing Vitória de Guimarães and Belenenses and amassing Primeira Liga totals of 86 games and eight goals over the course of three seasons, all with the former.

Club career
Prior to his arrival in Portugal] to sign with Vitória de Guimarães for the 2006–07 season (with the club in the second division, finally winning promotion), Paris-born Desmarets played the vast majority of his career in modest French clubs, never appearing in higher than the third level. He quickly became an undisputed starter, contributing with four goals in all 30 Primeira Liga games as the Minho team overachieved for a final third place in his second year, ahead of S.L. Benfica.

In June 2010, after only missing four league matches combined in two top level campaigns, adding four goals, 30-year-old Desmarets signed as a free agent for one year with Deportivo de La Coruña in Spain, with an option for another one. He only appeared in 12 La Liga games during the season – 693 minutes of action – which finished in relegation.

After a failed trial with Montreal Impact, Desmarets joined Kerkyra F.C. in Greece for 2011–12, appearing in no official matches. In early July 2012, he signed for C.F. Os Belenenses on a free transfer.

International career
Desmarets began appearing for Haiti at the age of nearly 34. His debut occurred on 8 June 2013 in Miami, as he played 85 minutes in a 2–1 loss against Spain.

References

External links

Red Star archives

1979 births
Living people
French sportspeople of Haitian descent
Footballers from Paris
Citizens of Haiti through descent
French footballers
Haitian footballers
Association football midfielders
Championnat National players
FC Les Lilas players
Red Star F.C. players
AS Poissy players
Primeira Liga players
Liga Portugal 2 players
Vitória S.C. players
C.F. Os Belenenses players
Deportivo de La Coruña players
A.O. Kerkyra players
Yves Desmarets
F.C. Felgueiras 1932 players
La Liga players
Yves Desmarets
Yves Desmarets
Haiti international footballers
2013 CONCACAF Gold Cup players
French expatriate footballers
Haitian expatriate footballers
Haitian expatriate sportspeople in Spain
Haitian expatriate sportspeople in Portugal
Haitian expatriate sportspeople in Greece
Haitian expatriate sportspeople in Thailand
Expatriate footballers in Portugal
Expatriate footballers in Spain
Expatriate footballers in Greece
Expatriate footballers in Thailand
French expatriate sportspeople in Portugal
French expatriate sportspeople in Spain
French expatriate sportspeople in Greece
French expatriate sportspeople in Thailand